Vahid Seyyed Abbasi (born in Urmia, West Azerbaijan)  is a volleyball player from Iran, who plays as a Setter for Shahrdari Urmia VC in Iranian Volleyball Super League. Vahid Seyyed Abbasi and his brother Jahangir Seyyed Abbasi are the uncles of Saeid Marouf.

References

Living people
Iranian men's volleyball players
People from Urmia
Year of birth missing (living people)